Georg Brandl Egloff is an American producer and composer of music for film, television, radio, and commercials. He has composed music for Shameless, The Goldbergs, The West Wing, and A&E Biography, and is credited with writing the station ID music for the FX channel and the Hallmark Channel.  He wrote the main theme music for This I Believe series on All Things Considered and Morning Edition, and composes and produces music for Milk Street Radio and America's Test Kitchen (PBS and NPR).

Early life
Georg Brandl Egloff was born in Monterey, California to David and Susan Egloff. He grew up in Oberlin, Ohio. While still in high school, he studied composition, electronic music, and jazz piano at the Oberlin Conservatory of Music. He attended the Berklee College of Music in Boston and received a bachelor's degree in performance and composition in 1986.

Music career
Egloff moved to New York City in 1986, where he performed as a jazz pianist in Manhattan. He served as the Tuesday night pianist at the famous Village Gate club on Bleecker Street. During that period, he performed at The Village Vanguard, the Blue Note, Chicago Blues, Zanzibar, the Knitting Factory, and Sweet Basil. He worked with many jazz and blues artists including Ruth Brown and Linda Hopkins.

In the 1990s, Egloff began working in rock and pop music venues with singers including Jeff Buckley, Joan Osborne, Ronnie Spector and Johnny Thunders. He recorded as a session keyboardist on many projects, including work for producers Phil Ramone and Frank Filipetti, and recorded a version of "My Way" for the Frank Sinatra Duets series.

He scored his first short film, The Anniversary, directed by Noah Kline in 1991.

Film and television music
In 1994, Egloff was hired to write music for the A&E Biography episode on Hillary Clinton, which led to work on 22 more episodes for the popular series. Soon he was writing music for other television documentaries, independent and short films, national commercials, and live events. He continues composing music for television, film, radio, commercials, podcasts, and other media.

He has written for ER, The West Wing, Pan Am, Third Watch, Shameless, and various programs airing on HBO,  Showtime, and Lifetime Television. His film work includes The Company Men, The Big Time, The Babymakers, and The Terminal.

In 2004, Egloff appeared in an episode of The West Wing playing a Hammond organ with James Taylor.

Filmography

References

American male composers
21st-century American composers
Living people
1963 births
21st-century American male musicians